, also known by his Chinese style name , was a bureaucrat of Ryukyu Kingdom.

Kochinda was the eldest son of Kushi Chōu, and he was also the second head of an aristocrat family, Shō-uji Tōme Dunchi. His younger brother Tasato Chōchoku, was a famous kumi odori playwright.

Kochinda served as a member of sanshikan from 1752 to 1765.

References

1701 births
1765 deaths
Ueekata
Sanshikan
People of the Ryukyu Kingdom
18th-century Ryukyuan people